The 48th Aviation Division was an air division of the Chinese People's Liberation Army Air Force active from 1971-92.

Approved by the Central Military Commission on August 4, 1970, the formation began in accordance with the notice of the Air Force Command and the Political Department on January 13, 1971. On April 1, 1971, the 48th Aviation Division was formally established in Leiyang, Hunan. The 142nd Regiment (adapted from the 30th Regiment of the 10th Air Division), the 143rd Regiment (reorganised from the 59th Regiment of the original 20th Aviation Division) is equipped with H-5 aircraft, commander Gao Yun, political commissar Zou Benhai. It belonged to the 12th Air Force Corps.

The 48th Air Division successively participated in the "Guangzi No. 3, No. 4, No. 5, and No. 6" exercises, the Sino-Vietnamese War, anti-flood activities, artificial rainfall, aerial seeding afforestation, aerial survey and other tasks, actively supporting the country's socialist construction. 

From January 19 to 22, 1974, the Guangzhou Military Region Air Force organized the 48th Air Division and the 5th Reconnaissance Regiment, dispatched aircraft, and participated in the military and naval missions during the Battle of the Paracel Islands against South Vietnam. Aircraft conducted aerial photo reconnaissance and theater patrols. The construction began on May 29, and they returned to their original locations on June 7.

In January 1976, after the 12th Air Force Corps was inactivated, the 48th Aviation Division was placed directly under the Guangzhou Military Region Air Force. The 5th Reconnaissance Regiment and the 142nd Regiment were disbanded after the reorganisation of September 1985. In September 1992 orders were issued to abolish the 48th Aviation Division and the 144th Regiment. The 143rd Regiment became an independent regiment after the division was disbanded.

References 

http://www.plaaf.net/Air-Force-Deploy/Guangzhou-Military-Region-Deploym/201203/6514.html

48
Military units and formations established in 1971
Military units and formations disestablished in 1992